The Spike is a 1997 book by Damien Broderick exploring the future of technology, and in particular the concept of the technological singularity.

A revised and updated edition was published in 2001 as The Spike: How Our Lives Are Being Transformed by Rapidly Advancing Technologies, New York: Tom Doherty Associates,  2001,  he  pbk. Library of Congress T14.B75 2001.

External links
review of 1997 paperback edition

Technology books
1997 non-fiction books
Singularitarianism
Transhumanist books